Andrew Rossi is an Emmy-nominated filmmaker, known for directing and writing The Andy Warhol Diaries (2022).

Career 
Rossi is the founder of Abstract Productions, a company that produces film and television. He was nominated for three Emmy Awards for writing, directing and executive producing the Netflix series The Andy Warhol Diaries in 2022.

In 2011, Rossi directed Page One: Inside the New York Times, which premiered at the Sundance Film Festival and was nominated for two News & Documentary Emmys and a 2011 Critics' Choice Award for Best Documentary.  The film was co-distributed by Magnolia Pictures and Participant Media.

In 2013, Rossi began production on his next film about the transformation of higher education. The film, Ivory Tower, premiered at the Sundance Film Festival and was theatrically distributed in 2014 by Samuel Goldwyn Films and Participant Media. After airing on CNN, the film was nominated for a News & Documentary Emmy for outstanding business and economic reporting.

Rossi's next film as director, The First Monday in May (2016), focused on the annual Met Gala and the Met's Costume Institute. The movie premiered as the opening night film at the 2016 Tribeca Film Festival. The year after Rossi directed Bronx Gothic, a collaboration with writer and performer Okwui Okpokwasili that captures her critically acclaimed one-woman show, Bronx Gothic.
Writing in the New Yorker, Hilton Als called Okpokwasili's Bronx Gothic "A tour de force on the order of Toni Morrison's The Bluest Eye, the author's seminal text on black girlhood and power."

In 2018, Rossi produced Kate Novack's The Gospel According to Andre, a biopic about legendary fashion editor Andre Leon Talley. He also executive produced the Netflix series 7 Days Out, directing episodes on the scientists and engineers behind NASA's Cassini mission, a final haute couture show from designer Karl Lagerfeld and the Westminster Dog Show. In 2018, Rossi was admitted into the Academy of Motion Picture Arts and Sciences.

In 2020 Rossi directed HBO's After Truth: Disinformation and the Cost of Fake News investigating the origins of conspiracies like pizzagate and the spread of false news from sites like 4Chan to the mainstream media. After Truth was a finalist for the duPont award in journalism. 

In 2021, the short film Hysterical Girl about the legacy of Freud's "Dora" case, directed by Kate Novack and produced by Rossi, was shortlisted for an Academy Award for best short film. Hysterical Girl was also nominated for an Emmy and the IDA's Best Documentary Short award.

In 2022, Rossi wrote, directed and executive produced The Andy Warhol Diaries. He took several years to secure the rights and adapt the diaries into a hybrid that combines recreations, archive and interviews before beginning production in 2020. The Netflix Series was nominated for a Gotham Award for Breakthrough Nonfiction Series, four primetime Emmys, and it won the GALECA award for Best Documentary Series, 2022.

In 2015, Rossi produced Thought Crimes, an HBO documentary about the case of the Cannibal Cop that examines the First Amendment implications of policing communication in fantasy forums online. This was his first collaboration with director Erin Lee Carr. In 2017, Rossi produced Carr's follow up to Thought Crimes for HBO, Mommy Dead and Dearest. Premiering at the SXSW Film Festival, the film tells the shocking story of Gypsy Rose Blancharde, who killed her mother after a lifetime of abuse as a victim of Dee Dee's Munchausen by proxy syndrome. They went on to produce Carr's two part film I Love You, Now Die: The Commonwealth Vs. Michelle Carter with the same team at Abstract Productions, premiering on HBO in 2019.

Filmography 

 2002: Eat This New York – director, producer, cinematographer, editor
 2004: Control Room – associate producer, additional editor
 2005: The Sky Did Not Fall – director, producer, cinematographer, editor
 2007: Le Cirque: A Table in Heaven – director, producer, cinematographer, editor
 2011: Page One: Inside the New York Times – director, producer, cinematographer, additional editor
 2014: Ivory Tower – director, writer, producer, cinematographer, editor
 2015: Thought Crimes: The Case of the Cannibal Cop – producer
 2016: The First Monday in May – director, cinematographer
 2017: Mommy Dead and Dearest – producer
 2017: Bronx Gothic – director, producer, cinematographer, co-editor
 2018: The Gospel According to Andre – producer
 2019: I Love You, Now Die: The Commonwealth Vs. Michelle Carter – producer
 2019: 7 Days Out – executive producer, director
 2019: The Queen's Man – producer
 2020: After Truth: Disinformation and the Cost of Fake News – director, producer
 2020: Hysterical Girl - producer
 2022: The Andy Warhol Diaries - writer, director, executive producer

Early life and education 
Rossi grew up in New York and was a first gen college student, graduating from Yale College and Harvard Law School.

References

External links 
 
 
 Andrew Rossi profile on indieWire
 C-SPAN Q&A interview with Rossi about Page One, June 19, 2011

Living people
American documentary filmmakers
Film directors from New York City
Collegiate School (New York) alumni
Yale College alumni
Harvard Law School alumni
Academic journal editors
Skadden, Arps, Slate, Meagher & Flom people
Year of birth missing (living people)